Holywell Press Ltd is a family printing and publishing company based in Oxford, England.

The firm was established in 1890 by Harry Burrows and Jack Doe. A major customer has been the University of Oxford, including publication of the university student magazine Isis for many years. It also produced early advertising for Morris cars. Harry Burrows was a personal friend of the founder William Morris (later Lord Nuffield).

The company took its name from the Holywell Room in Oxford. Initially, the company premises were in the octagonal former Chapel of St Mary at the junction of Broad Street and Catte Street, now part of Hertford College. In 1920/1, it moved to the Maclaren Gymnasium in Alfred Street, with much more room for printing. In 1989, it moved to a purpose-built factory building in Ferry Hinksey Road, at Osney Mead in west Oxford. The company has been run by the Burrows family throughout its existence, most recently by Benjamin Burrows.

Selected books
Geoffrey Bolton, History of the O.U.C.C., 1962.
A. Philippou (ed.), The Orthodox Ethos, 1964.
Andrew S. N. Wright, The History of Buckland in the County of Berkshire, 1966.
Humphry J. M. Bowen, The Flora of Berkshire, 1968.

References

External links
Holywell Press website

Book publishing companies of England
Magazine publishing companies of England
Printing companies of the United Kingdom
Companies based in Oxford
Publishing companies established in 1890
1890 establishments in England
Private companies limited by guarantee of England
Hertford College, Oxford